Zohra Abdulla gizi Abdullayeva (18 December 1952 – 28 May 2021) was an Azerbaijani singer.

Early life
Abdullayeva was born on 16 December 1952 in Shusha. She graduated from Azerbaijan Technological University. She received individual mugam lessons from artists such as Sara Gadimova, Abulfat Aliyev and Munavvar Kalantarli. Her first teacher was Rahila Hasanova. Islam Rzayev brought Abdullayeva to the professional stage.

Career
Abdullayeva worked as a soloist of the "Lalə qızlar anasmblının" (Lala Girls Ensemble) and then as a soloist of the Azerbaijan State Philharmonic. She is  known for her duets with Mammadbagir Bagirzade. She also sang folk and composer songs and mughams. She sang Azerbaijani music in thirty countries around the world. In 1985, Abdullayeva won the "İstedadlar axtarılır" (Looking for Talents) concert competition. In 2000, she was awarded a diploma at the Babylonian Festival in Baghdad.

Personal life and death
Abdullayeva married at the age of 16. She had one son and two grandchildren. Her son died on 28 May 2018 from a serious illness. Abdullayeva died on 28 May 2021 after a long and serious illness.

References

1952 births
2021 deaths
People from Shusha
Mugham singers
20th-century Azerbaijani women singers
Azerbaijan Technological University alumni